John Watkins (April 13, 1834 – December 23, 1902) was a practical architect and builder in London and Utah.

He was born in Maidstone, Kent, England.  While living in London, he converted to the Church of Jesus Christ of Latter-day Saints in 1852, and four years later he and his family emigrated to Salt Lake City, settling in Provo, Utah. While in Provo, Watkins worked on the Old Provo Tabernacle. In 1865, after marrying twice more, he moved to Midway, Utah, where he designed some of his best-known works. He also served for 17 years as an LDS Bishop until his death Christmas of 1902.

A number of his works are listed on the U.S. National Register of Historic Places.

Watkins designed some LDS meetinghouses in Provo and Springville.

Works include:
George Bonner Jr. House, 90 E. Main, Midway, Utah, NRHP-listed
George Bonner Sr. House, 103 E. Main, Midway, Utah, NRHP-listed
William Bonner House, 110 E. Main, Midway, Utah, NRHP-listed
William Coleman House, 180 N. Center, Midway, Utah, NRHP-listed
John and Margaret Watkins House, 22 W. Hundred S, Midway, Utah, NRHP-listed
Watkins–Coleman House, 5 E. Main St., Midway, Utah, NRHP-listed

References

19th-century American architects
Architects from Kent
Architects of Latter Day Saint religious buildings and structures
People from Maidstone
People from Midway, Utah
English Latter Day Saints
Converts to Mormonism
1834 births
British emigrants to the United States
Architects from Utah
1902 deaths
English leaders of the Church of Jesus Christ of Latter-day Saints
Artists from Provo, Utah
Latter Day Saints from Utah